Dossier K. is a Flemish thriller film directed by Jan Verheyen, based on a novel by Jef Geeraerts. Dossier K. is the second book by Jef Geeraerts for the series about detectives Vincke and Verstuyft that has been put to screen after De zaak Alzheimer. Several actors from the first film reprise their roles, including Koen De Bouw, Werner De Smedt, Hilde De Baerdemaeker, Filip Peters and Jappe Claes. It is a film about crimes in the Albanian mafia scene in Antwerp.

Plot
Nazim Tahiri (Blerim Destani) finds out that his father has been murdered in Antwerp by members of the rival Gaba clan. Kanun, an Albanian law from the 15th century, forces Nazim to take revenge. He goes to Antwerp, where his godfather, Prenk Shehu (R. Kan Albay), leads the family mafia businesses.

Police officer Vincke (Koen De Bouw) is in charge of finding out what is going on in the world of the Albanian mafia clans.

Cast
 Koen De Bouw as Eric Vincke
 Werner De Smedt as Freddy Verstuyft
 Blerim Destani as Nazim Tahiri
 Hilde De Baerdemaeker as Linda de Leenheer
 Greg Timmermans as Wim Cassiers
 Johan Van Assche as Commissaris François Vanparys
 Filip Peeters as Majoor De Keyser
 Jappe Claes as Procureur Marcel Bracke
 Marieke Dilles as Naomi Waldack
 R. Kan Albay as Prenk Shehu
 Vildan Maksuti as Tahir Ukaj
 Stijn Van Opstal as Scientist
 Katelijne Verbeke as Mother Naomi
 Peter Gorissen as Lawyer Waldack 
 Sven De Ridder as Balieman
 Kristian Paloka as Zef Shehu
 Ryszard Turbiasz as De Magere
 Fatos Kryeziu as Pjeter Gaba
 Çun Lajqi as Besjan Tahiri

References

External links
 
 

2009 films
Belgian thriller films
Albanian-language films
2000s Dutch-language films
Films shot in Antwerp
Films set in Antwerp
Films about organized crime in Belgium
2009 thriller films